Limbe Airport  was a public use airport located  southeast of Limbe, Sud-Ouest, Cameroon.

See also
List of airports in Cameroon

References

External links 
 Airport record for Limbe Airport at Landings.com

Airports in Cameroon
Southwest Region (Cameroon)